The Little Chapel That Stood is a 2003 children's picture book with verses by A. B. Curtiss and pictures by Mirto Golino. The book's cover features a watercolor painting by Mirto Golino that depicts the chapel surrounded by high rises in Manhattan in 2001, including the North and South Towers of the World Trade Center. The title is a nod to the children's picture-book classic The Little Engine that Could by Watty Piper.

The book has been used in schools and is recommended as a way to introduce a difficult topic to children for discussion. The nickname "Little Chapel that Stood" has become a general way to refer to the building.

References 

2003 children's books
2003 poems
2003 poetry books
American picture books
American poetry books
Books about the September 11 attacks
Children's poetry books